Julietta is an opera by Bohuslav Martinů based on a play by Georges Neveux.

Julietta may also refer to:

Arts
 Juliette, or Key of Dreams, a 1951 French film based on a play by Georges Neveux
 Julietta (Erbse opera), a 1959 opera by Heimo Erbse
 Julietta (film), a 1953 French comedy romance film
 Julietta (musician), an American singer-songwriter active since 2015

Other uses
 Julietta, Indiana, a neighborhood in Indianapolis, US
 Saint Julietta (died 304), Christian martyr
 1285 Julietta, a main-belt asteroid

See also
 Julieta (disambiguation)
 Juliet (disambiguation)
 Juliette (disambiguation)